Haymarket is a Tyne and Wear Metro station, serving the Haymarket area of the city of Newcastle upon Tyne in Tyne and Wear, England. It joined the network as a terminus station on 11 August 1980, following the opening of the first phase of the network, between Haymarket and Tynemouth via Four Lane Ends.

History
The station opened to through services on 15 November 1981, following the opening of the third phase of the network, between Haymarket and Heworth. Prior to this, trains reversed using the crossover between Haymarket and Monument.

Haymarket is located at the northern end of Northumberland Street. It is a short walk from both Newcastle and Northumbria University, Newcastle Civic Centre and the Great North Museum: Hancock.

It is the deepest station on the Tyne and Wear Metro network. Prior to the station's refurbishment in the late 2000s, the staircase (since replaced by a third escalator) had 105 steps. The station also has underground rooms, restricted from the public, which contain archives and various historical documents.

The station was used by 3,216,144 passengers in 2017–18, making it the second-most-used station on the network after Monument (5,245,507).

Haymarket Hub
In August 2006, final plans for the complete reconstruction of the station, costing £20million, were released. Plans for a proposed £9 million facelift for the station had previously been announced in 2004.

Tolent Construction was appointed as contractor for the project, and was headed by the development vehicle, 42nd Street Haymarket Hub. Reid Jubb Brown were the building's architects, with Arup employed as consulting engineers.

Newcastle-based creative communications agency, Gardiner Richardson, alongside University of Sunderland lecturer, Lothar Goetz, worked on redeveloping the station's passenger areas. Gardiner Richardson's work centred on updating Tyne and Wear Metro corporate branding, including the colour palette and signage. Lothar Goetz created an artwork, Canon, using a number of coloured vitreous enamel panels in the concourse, escalator shaft and platform area.

A total of £5million was spent on refurbishing the passenger area of the station, with work completed in 2009. The station now serves as a blueprint for other station modernisation projects within the Metro: All Change programme, with Central refurbished to a similar style in 2017.

The Princess Royal, Princess Anne, officially opened the newly refurbished Haymarket on 29 March 2010, after travelling on the Tyne and Wear Metro from Jesmond.

Haymarket Hub was shortlisted for the 2010 Carbuncle Cup – an architecture prize, given annually by Building Design to "the ugliest building in the United Kingdom completed in the last 12 months".

Facilities 
Step-free access is available at all stations across the Tyne and Wear Metro network, with a lift providing step-free access to platforms at Haymarket. As part of the station's refurbishment, lifts and escalators were replaced, with an additional third escalator installed. The station is equipped with ticket machines, seating, next train information displays, timetable posters, and an emergency help point on both platforms. Ticket machines are able to accept payment with credit and debit card (including contactless payment), notes and coins. The station is fitted with automatic ticket barriers, which were installed at 13 stations across the network during the early 2010s, as well as smartcard validators, which feature at all stations. The station houses a number of shops, services and offices, as well as a Nexus TravelShop.

There is no dedicated car parking available at the station. There is a taxi rank located adjacent to the nearby Haymarket Bus Station. There is also the provision for cycle parking, with 46 cycle spaces and 20 cycle racks available for use.

Services 
, the station is served by up to ten trains per hour on weekdays and Saturday, and up to eight trains per hour during the evening and on Sunday.

Rolling stock used: Class 599 Metrocar

Gallery

Notes

References

External links

Timetable and station information for Haymarket

Newcastle upon Tyne
1980 establishments in England
Railway stations in Great Britain opened in 1980
Railway stations located underground in the United Kingdom
Transport in Tyne and Wear
Tyne and Wear Metro Green line stations
Tyne and Wear Metro Yellow line stations